Witman Hung Wai-man,  (born 3 January 1969) is a Hong Kong investor and politician, who is the Principal Liaison Officer for Hong Kong of the Shenzhen Qianhai Authority and independent non-executive director in four companies listed in the Hong Kong Stock Exchange. He is also one of the Hong Kong deputies to the National People's Congress and a member of Shenzhen's Chinese People's Political Consultative Conference.

Controversies 

On 5 January 2022, Carrie Lam announced new warnings and restrictions against social gatherings due to a potential new round of COVID-19 outbreak. One day later, it was discovered that Hung's 53rd birthday party hosted 222 guests. At least one guest was tested positive with COVID-19, therefore many attendees had to be quarantined, including several principal officials of Hong Kong.

References 

Living people
1969 births
Hong Kong pro-Beijing politicians